The Screen Actors Guild Award for Outstanding Performance by a Cast (or Ensemble) in a Drama Series is an award given by the Screen Actors Guild to honor the finest ensemble acting achievements in drama series.

Winners and nominees

1990s

2000s

2010s

2020s

Multiple awards
2 awards
The Crown (consecutive)
Boardwalk Empire (consecutive)
Mad Men (consecutive)
Six Feet Under (consecutive)
The Sopranos
This Is Us (consecutive)
The West Wing (consecutive)

3 awards
Downton Abbey (2 consecutive)

4 awards
ER (consecutive)

Multiple nominations
2 nominations
House of Cards
Picket Fences
This Is Us

3 nominations
24
Better Call Saul
Boston Legal
Breaking Bad
The Good Wife
Grey's Anatomy
Ozark
The Practice
Stranger Things
The X-Files

4 nominations
Chicago Hope
CSI: Crime Scene Investigation
Dexter
The Handmaid's Tale
Homeland

5 nominations
Boardwalk Empire
The Closer
The Crown
Downton Abbey
Six Feet Under

6 nominations
Mad Men
NYPD Blue
The West Wing

7 nominations
ER
Game of Thrones
The Sopranos

9 nominations
Law & Order

Nominations by network 

 HBO – 31
 NBC – 24
 ABC – 16
 Netflix – 15
 CBS – 14
 AMC – 12
 Showtime – 8
 Fox – 7
 PBS – 5
 TNT – 5
 Hulu – 3
 Apple TV+ – 2
 FX – 1
 Paramount Network – 1

See also
 Primetime Emmy Award for Outstanding Drama Series
 Golden Globe Award for Best Television Series – Drama
 Critics' Choice Television Award for Best Drama Series

External links 
 SAG Awards official site

Ensemble Drama Series
Outstanding Performance by an Ensemble in a Drama Series Screen Actors Guild Award winners
Television awards for best cast